Ian Alexander Rutherford (born  30 June 1957) was a New Zealand cricketer who played for Central Districts and Otago between 1974 and 1984. In 1978-79 in the Shell Trophy Final he batted for 625 minutes for his highest first-class score of 222 for Otago against Central Districts in New Plymouth. He is the older brother of Ken Rutherford. He also played for Central Otago in the Hawke Cup.

Rutherford played 79 first class matches and scored 3794 runs at an average of 27.10 with five centuries and 16 fifties. He also played 21 List A matches, scoring 449 runs at an average of 14.96 with one century and one fifty.

References

1957 births
Living people
New Zealand cricketers
Central Districts cricketers
Otago cricketers
Worcestershire cricketers
Cricketers from Dunedin
South Island cricketers
North Island cricketers